, also known simply as Ameagari, was a Japanese comedy duo (kombi) consisting of Hiroyuki Miyasako and Tōru Hotohara. They are from Osaka and, like most other comedians from the Kansai region, are employed by Yoshimoto Kogyo. The duo was created in 1989 and disbanded on Aug 17, 2021.

Their kombi name translates to Post-Rain Suicide Squad. Their namesake was a concert tour by RC Succession (a favorite rock band of theirs) that occurred while they were both students at Yoshimoto Kogyo: New Star Creation. It was based on one of their singles, "Ameagari no Yozora ni" ("To the Post-Rain Nightsky").

They are friends with Downtown and are common guests on their show, Downtown no Gaki no Tsukai ya Arahende!!, usually when extra members are needed for a game. Both kombi are regulars on LINCOLN.

Members 
 - Plays the boke. Married with one child. Notoriously narcissistic. In his trademark greeting, he points both index fingers towards the viewer (in a "bang bang" pose) and happily proclaims "I'm Miyasako!" ("Miyasako desu!"),
 - Plays the tsukkomi, but is able to be both a boke and tsukkomi. Married in 2004 to his long-time girlfriend. Known for his bowl cut hair and his quick temper.

Hosted Shows
 (MBS, since 1999)
 (CBC, since 2001)
 (TV Asahi, since 2003)
 (TBS, since 2005)
 (TV Tokyo, 2006-2009)
 (2006-2007)
 (2007-2009)
 (Kansai TV, since 2010)
 (Nippon TV, since 2010)
 (TBS, since 2010)

References

External links
Ameagari Kesshita's profile on the official Yoshimoto Kōgyō homepage

Japanese comedy duos
People from Osaka